Interstate 26 (I-26) is a main route of the Interstate Highway System in the Southeastern United States. Nominally east–west, as indicated by its even number, I-26 runs from the junction of U.S. Route 11W (US 11W) and US 23 in Kingsport, Tennessee, generally southeastward to US 17 in Charleston, South Carolina. The portion from Mars Hill, North Carolina, east (compass south) to I-240 in Asheville, North Carolina, has signs indicating FUTURE I-26, because the highway does not yet meet all of the Interstate Highway standards. A short realignment, as an improvement in the freeway, was also planned in Asheville but has been postponed indefinitely due to North Carolina's budget shortfalls. 

Northward from Kingsport, US 23 continues to Portsmouth, Ohio, as Corridor B of the Appalachian Development Highway System, and beyond to Columbus, Ohio, as Corridor C. In conjunction with the Columbus–Toledo corridor in Ohio formed by I-75, US 23, and State Route 15 (SR 15), I-26 forms part of a mostly high-speed four-or-more-lane highway from the Great Lakes to the Atlantic Coast at Charleston, South Carolina. There are no official plans for extensions north of Kingsport, Tennessee.

Route description

|-
|TN
|54
|87
|-
|NC
|53
|86
|-
|SC
|221
|356
|-
|Total
|328
|529
|}

I-26 is a diagonal Interstate Highway, which runs northwest–southeast. The extension north of Asheville is mostly north–south. Where I-26 crosses the French Broad River in Asheville at the Jeffrey Bowen Bridge (previously known as the Smoky Park Bridge), the highway runs in opposite directions from its designations. (I-26 westbound actually goes east. I-26 runs concurrently with I-240, so that I-240 eastbound and I-26 westbound are the same route.) When the extension was made in 2003, the exit numbers in North Carolina were increased by 31 to reflect the new mileage. The part that it shares with I-240 is signed as both I-240 and I-26 but follows the I-240 exit numbering pattern.

I-26 has signs with an extra FUTURE sign above (and in the same style as) the EAST and WEST signs from Asheville north to Mars Hill, North Carolina, because the older US 23 freeway does not yet meet all of the Interstate Highway standards. The road shoulders remain substandard or nonexistent along short sections of the route. A rebuild and relocation is also planned in Asheville to avoid some tight interchanges.

Tennessee

The exit numbers in Tennessee were formerly numbered backward—increasing from east (physically south) to west (physically north)—because this highway was formerly signed north–south as US 23 (and I-181). Although this is consistent with the south-to-north numbering conventions, this exit numbering was changed on all 284 signs along I-26 to be consistent with the rest of the east-to-west-numbered highway in March 2007. The remaining I-181 signs north of I-81 were also replaced with I-26 signs at that time.

For its entire length in Tennessee, I-26 shares the route with US 23. The route is named the James H. Quillen Parkway, after Jimmy Quillen, a past member of the US House of Representatives for Tennessee.

I-26 begins at the junction of US 23 with US 11W (which is locally named Stone Drive) northwest of the city. It reaches its major interchange with I-81 at exit 8A, southwest of Colonial Heights.

Shortly after entering Washington County, it reaches the northwest part of Johnson City and also serves as a local transit route as it makes its way around the north and eastern parts of the city. It begins to travel through more obviously mountainous terrain before turning to travel in a south direction. Entering Carter County briefly, it passes exit 27 before entering the Cherokee National Forest and Unicoi County. From this point, it passes through part of the Blue Ridge Mountains, first the Unaka Range and, later, as it passes Erwin, Tennessee, between exits 34 and 40, the Bald Mountains. It meets the Nolichucky River just after milemarker 38 and travels along its southeast bank before crossing it immediately before exit 40.

The remainder of I-26 in Tennessee passes through a sparsely populated area, at elevations of above , before reaching the North Carolina state line.

North Carolina

About  beyond Spartanburg, one reaches the foothills of the Blue Ridge Mountains. After crossing the border into Polk County, I-26 intersects with US 74, a limited-access freeway near Columbus, and it heads up a 6% grade for the next  through Howard Gap. The land flattens substantially after entering the French Broad River drainage basin from Flat Rock to Hendersonville, Fletcher, and Arden.

I-26 has a major interchange with I-40 in Asheville. After , US 23 joins I-26 west of Asheville and follows it into Tennessee. As I-240 continues to swing round to the north and east of Asheville, I-26 turns north toward Weaverville and Mars Hill. It enters first the Blue Ridge and then the Walnut Mountains and Bald Mountains of the Appalachian range, passing through the Pisgah and Cherokee National Forests as it does so.

As I-26 crosses the Bald Mountains near the North Carolina–Tennessee state line, it travels through a relatively high-elevation rural area. At Buckner Gap, I-26 reaches  in elevation. For  on each side of the state line, its elevation is at least .

I-26 has been deemed a scenic highway in North Carolina between its interchange with US 19/US 23 N (exit 9) and the North Carolina–Tennessee border. At Sam's Gap, the Appalachian Trail crosses under I-26. In addition, northbound travelers are able to see the Blue Ridge Parkway.

South Carolina

Beginning in the city of Charleston, I-26 travels northwesterly over flat plains with little urbanization past Summerville. After the junction with I-95 just inside of Orangeburg County, the terrain becomes somewhat hilly. Orangeburg is the first major stop outside Charleston with several exits bearing this name.

Beyond I-77 is the Columbia metropolitan area with lodging, dining, and shopping possibilities. This metropolitan area ends mostly after exit 101, past which the terrain becomes somewhat hilly once again. The next major city is Newberry. Later, I-26 splits off north toward Spartanburg, where I-26 has a junction with the I-85 corridor, which has a significant amount of international business and manufacturing.

I-26 is deemed a hurricane evacuation route in South Carolina. During hurricane evacuation, lane reversal on I-26 will occur between its junctions with I-526 in Charleston and I-77 in Columbia. This is to aid travelers leaving the Charleston area. Lane reversal on I-26 has been used, such as during evacuations for Hurricane Florence in September 2018.

History
Funding for I-26 in South Carolina was provided by the Federal Aid Highway Act of 1956. The first section of I-26 was built in South Carolina between Columbia and Charleston. Construction started in 1957 and ended in 1969 with an  portion opening on September 7, 1960. By fall 1960, I-26 was complete from Spartanburg to Columbia, and, in February 1969, I-26's construction from the South Carolina–North Carolina border to Columbia was completed at a cost of $118 million (equivalent to $ million in ).

I-26 between the South Carolina–North Carolina border and Asheville was completed in 1976 at a cost of $54.1 million (equivalent to $ million in ).

The planning for an extension of I-26 from Asheville to I-81 near Kingsport started in 1987 to accommodate truckers traveling toward I-81 that were banned on US 19 and US 23. I-26 from Mars Hill, North Carolina, to the North Carolina–Tennessee border opened in August 2003 at a cost of $230 million (equivalent to $ million in ). Also in 2003, the full extension of I-26 from the North Carolina–Tennessee border to I-81 was completed and opened.

Interstate 181

Interstate 181 (I-181) was established in December 1985 as an Interstate designation of US 23, which was already built to Interstate standards in the 1970s. In Tennessee, I-181 traversed from US 321/SR 67, in Johnson City, to US 11W/SR 1, in Kingsport, totaling . All exit numbers were based on US 23 mileage. On August 5, 2003, after completion of a  section in North Carolina, I-26 was extended west into Tennessee, replacing I-181 from Johnson City to I-81; north of I-81, I-181 continued into Kingsport.

The American Association of State Highway and Transportation Officials (AASHTO) initially ruled against an extension of I-26 (as the number) along the remainder of I-181 to Kingsport since that would give a main route Interstate Highway (I-26) a so-called "stub end", not connecting to any other Interstate Highway, an international border, or a seacoast. In 2005, the numerical extension was enacted by the effect of the Safe, Accountable, Flexible, Efficient Transportation Equity Act: A Legacy for Users (SAFETEA-LU), being signed into law on August 10. In March 2007, I-181 was officially decommissioned, as all signs and exit numbers were changed over to I-26's designation.

Exit list

Auxiliary routes
I-126 is a spur into Columbia from the northwest; established in 1961, it shares complete concurrency with US 76.
I-326 was an unsigned designated spur to South Carolina Highway 48 (SC 48) in Columbia; approved in 1976, it was decommissioned in 1995 in favor of I-77.
I-526 is a partial beltway of Charleston, running from US 17 west of the city north to I-26 and back east and south to US 17 in Mount Pleasant; it was established in 1989 and features a business spur on its eastern terminus.

References

External links

News article listing new I-26 exit numbers published March 2, 2007

 
Interstate Highway System
Interstate Highways in Tennessee